Hydrophis spiralis, commonly known as the yellow sea snake, is a species of venomous sea snake in the family Elapidae.

Description
This marine serpent is cathemeral, i.e., active both by day and night.

Diagnostic characteristics
The scales on the thickest part of the body have rounded or pointed tips, and are imbricate. Six or seven maxillary teeth are found behind the fangs. The species has 25–31 scale rows around its neck, 33–38 around its midbody, and ventrals number 295–362, and are distinct throughout and about twice as broad as adjacent body scales. Its color is yellowish or yellowish-green above; the dorsal scales are edged with black, and 41–46 narrow black bands encircle the body; the bands are usually less than one-third the width of the lighter interspaces. The head, in the young, is black, with a yellow horseshoe-shaped marking; in the adult, the head is usually yellow.

Geographic range
It is also found in Pakistan, Sri Lanka, India (incl. Andaman & Nicobar Is.), Indonesia, Bangladesh, Malaysia, Philippines, China, New Guinea, New Caledonia/Loyalty Islands, Thailand, Vietnam, Brunei, Cambodia and Myanmar. The species has been reported to live in waters as deep as 50m.

Venom
The venom of H. spiralis  has been studied for its medicinal antitumor properties.

References

Further reading
 Frith, C.B. 1977. The sea snake Hydrophis spiralis (Shaw); a new species of the fauna of Thailand. Nat. Hist. Bull. Siam Soc. (Bangkok) 26: 339–341.
 Shaw, G. 1802. General Zoology or Systematic Natural History, Vol. III., Part II. Amphibia. G. Kearsley (Thomas Davison, printer). London. vi + 313–365. (Hydrus spiralis, p. 564.)
 The IUCN Red List of Threatened Species(http://oldredlist.iucnredlist.org/details/176717/0).

spiralis
Fauna of Southeast Asia
Reptiles described in 1802